Seven of Swords is a Minor Arcana tarot card.
Tarot cards are used throughout much of Europe to play Tarot card games.

In English-speaking countries, where the games are largely unknown, Tarot cards came to be utilized primarily for divinatory purposes.

Divination usage

A hasty decision, greed and/or thoughtless behavior, the individual acts in an impulsive fashion. It represents secret plans, hidden dishonor, frustration and the possibility of failure.

Common interpretation

The Seven of Swords, when upright, means to use your wits for diplomacy and not to use aggression. This is why it can be viewed as secret planning or hidden dishonor.  Your acts may be legitimate.  However, you prefer to use your mind and intellect rather than force or via obvious means.

The Reversed meaning of the card means excess use of intellect with little success on an outcome, to surrender, or to have little care on solving a problem. The questioner needs to break away from ingrained habits or ways to approach problems.

Rider–Waite symbolism

The figure is taking stealthy steps, looking back to examine the scene he is leaving. Apparently he is doing something he knows he should not be doing, and is attempting to get away with it anyway.

References

Suit of Swords